Cemal Polat (born December 23, 1987), is a Kurdish-born British Entrepreneur, Businessman, Author, Investor, and founder of CP Café consultancy food and beverage (F&B) and investment consultancy firm based in London and Turkey. He is the owner of food chains such as café 215 Hackney, and others. 215 Hackney won the award of favorite's café in 2021 by Gazette readers.

Early Life & Career 
Cemal was born in Sivas, Turkey in Kurdish family later moved in England. He started his career as a business and economics teacher in 2011 at Sir George Monoux college in East London. Then he started his car leasing company in 2015, and opened 4 cafe's from 2016 to 2022. Cemal's consultancy business started in 2019 before pandemic. he has authored two books, namely "Launch Your Own Café" and "Strategic Planning for Beginners," with the latter becoming a best-selling book.

References

1987 births
Living people
Turkish businesspeople